The 2019 St. Petersburg Open was a tennis tournament played on indoor hard courts. It was the 24th edition of the St. Petersburg Open, and part of the ATP Tour 250 Series of the 2019 ATP Tour. It took place at the Sibur Arena in Saint Petersburg, Russia, from September 16 through 22, 2019.

Singles main-draw entrants

Seeds

 1 Rankings are as of September 9, 2019

Other entrants
The following players received wildcards into the singles main draw:
  Evgeny Donskoy
  Dudi Sela
  Jannik Sinner

The following players received entry using a protected ranking into the main draw:
  Jozef Kovalík
  Janko Tipsarević

The following players received entry from the qualifying draw:
  Egor Gerasimov
  Ilya Ivashka
  Lukáš Rosol
  Alexey Vatutin

The following players received entry as lucky losers:
  Damir Džumhur
  Matteo Viola

Withdrawals
Before the tournament
  Tomáš Berdych → replaced by  Damir Džumhur
  Laslo Đere → replaced by  Matteo Viola
  Miomir Kecmanović → replaced by  Jozef Kovalík
  Corentin Moutet → replaced by  Janko Tipsarević
  Stan Wawrinka → replaced by  Salvatore Caruso

Retirements
  Márton Fucsovics
  Janko Tipsarević

Doubles main-draw entrants

Seeds

 Rankings are as of September 9, 2019

Other entrants
The following pairs received wildcards into the doubles main draw:
  Evgeny Donskoy /  Konstantin Kravchuk
  Evgeny Karlovskiy /  Andrey Rublev

Champions

Singles

  Daniil Medvedev def.  Borna Ćorić, 6–3, 6–1

Doubles

   Divij Sharan /  Igor Zelenay def.  Matteo Berrettini /  Simone Bolelli, 6–3, 3–6, [10–8]

References

External links
Official website

St. Petersburg Open
St Petersburg Open
St Petersburg Open
St. Petersburg Open